Eslami Emam Reza Garrison ( – Pādegān-e Eslāmī Emām Rez̤ā) is a village and military installation in Qareh Naz Rural District of the Central District of Maragheh County, East Azerbaijan province, Iran. At the 2006 National Census, its population was 3,361 in 853 households. The following census in 2011 counted 4,492 people in 697 households. The latest census in 2016 showed a population of 4,562 people in 599 households; it was the most populous locality in its rural district.

References 

Maragheh County

Populated places in East Azerbaijan Province

Populated places in Maragheh County

Military installations of Iran